Samseong-dong is a ward of Dong-gu, Daejeon, South Korea.

References

Dong District, Daejeon
Neighbourhoods in South Korea